ROLI is a London-based music technology company known for its innovative high tech musical instruments, particularly the ROLI Seaboard, a MIDI controller with soft, rubbery keys and continuous, rather than discrete, pitches, and pitch-bending capabilities. ROLI was founded by American-born musician and entrepreneur Roland Lamb in 2009. Its  instruments have been used by musicians including Grimes, A. R. Rahman, and Hans Zimmer.

On September 3, 2021, media reported that ROLI had filed for administration under UK business law. Administration is not the same as bankruptcy, but the administration process has some similarities, insofar as the firm acknowledges that it cannot pay all its debts, to enable a restructuring plan to be set up.  ROLI is relaunching as Luminary, a subscription-based keyboard teaching system for novice keyboard players. Luminary uses a light-up keyboard that shows you which notes to play, along with a subscription-based music instructional software.

History 
Pianist Roland Lamb founded ROLI in 2009 while a graduate student at London's Royal College of Art. His first prototype of the Seaboard was a response to the design limitations of the piano keyboard as a mechanical interface. As a jazz pianist, he wanted to create  pitch and timbre effects on a keyboard that are often associated with bowed string and orchestral brass instruments. His concept of a soft, pliable, continuous "keywave surface" was the technological foundation of the Seaboard and the firm's related instruments.

ROLI's Series A fundraising in 2014 raised $12.8 million, followed by a $27 million Series B fundraising in 2016. In April 2017 ROLI raised debt funding from Kreos Capital.

The company is based in Dalston, London, with offices also in New York and Los Angeles. It sells its products in over 40 countries worldwide. It has acquired the following companies: JUCE, FXpansion, and Blend.

The firm has named Pharrell Williams as Chief Creative Officer.

In April 2020, Roli sold the JUCE product to PACE Anti-Piracy firm.

The company lost money in 2019 and 2020, and in late 2021 declared bankruptcy.   A new company, named Luminary, formed by Lamb with $6M in startup funds from investors, will receive ownership of many of Roli's products.

Products

Seaboard 
ROLI's first instrument, the ROLI Seaboard, is a synthesizer controller based on the piano keyboard. The instrument has a continuous surface of pliable silicone rather than the discrete keys of a piano. This lets a musician play "in between" the keys of a standard piano. A player can bend the pitch of a note by making vibrato-like sideways movements, deepen a sound by pressing into the surface, and in other ways manipulate sound through touch.

The instrument is available in two versions: The  Seaboard GRAND is a premium synthesizer with a pliable, compliant, touch-sensitive "keywave surface" and an embedded sound engine" It appeared in the Oscar-winning film La La Land. The Seaboard Rise is a USB and Bluetooth powered MIDI controller with a similar keyboard, but smaller in size and with additional functions.

Seaboard Rise 2 was announced at the end of March 2022, promising a more durable chassis, changes to the internal components and different ports. The keyboard will also have ridges in the center of each key.

Blocks 
In 2016, Roli launched a modular system called BLOCKS. The lineup consisted of two playing surfaces and three control blocks. The first playing surface, the Lightpad Block, was a square device that combined a Seaboard-like surface with a grid of LEDs, allowing the user to switch between various pad layouts. A revised version, the Lightpad M, was released in 2017 with improvements having been made to the device's pressure sensitivity. Alongside the Lightpad M, Roli also offers a Seaboard Block, which is a miniaturized 24 key version of the Rise. Connections between Blocks are made through magnetic ports that transfer both power and MIDI data between them, while a connection to a computer or mobile device takes the form of Bluetooth or USB.

The newest member of the blocks modular system is called LUMI, which was funded during a Kickstarter campaign in 2019. Roli's target of £100,000 was reached within under two hours. While the LUMI does not have a pliable, continuous surface like the other blocks playing surfaces, it does have 24 keys similar to a standard piano keyboard, with each of them RGB illuminated.

Software 
The company created the "Noise" app and the Equator software synthesizer. It has also acquired a number of companies including the virtual instruments maker FXpansion and the social music-sharing platform Blend. Roli held the rights to the C++ audio coding framework JUCE from 2014, but sold them to iLok software owner PACE in 2020.
NOISE is a music-making app for iOS and Android devices and is also the software system for "Roli Blocks"

Equator is a software synthesizer for MIDI Polyphonic Expression (MPE) and the go-to sound engine for the "Seaboard Grand", "Seaboard Rise" And "ROLI Blocks" on a desktop computer. It works on both Mac OS and Windows. Additional expressive sounds and modulation tools can be loaded into the software synthesizer via the internet.

Awards 
In 2014 the ROLI Seaboard GRAND was awarded with the 'Design of the Year' award from the Design Museum of London, and the Swarovski Emerging Talent Medal presented at the Celebration of Design Awards at the London Design Festival.

The ROLI Seaboard RISE 25 won a "Best of Innovation" award from the Consumer Technology Association and ‘2015 Product of the Year’ by FutureMusic.

References

External links
 Official website

Instrument makers
Manufacturing in the United Kingdom
MIDI controllers